"California Girls" is a song by the Beach Boys.

California Girl(s) may also refer to:

Music
"California Girls", 2006 song by Gretchen Wilson
"California Gurls", 2010 song by Katy Perry
"California Girl", a 1977 song by Chilliwack
"California Girl", a 1970 song by Eddie Floyd
California Girl, a 2002 album by Nancy Sinatra
 "California Girls", a 2008 song by the Magnetic Fields from  Distortion
"California Girl", a 2009 song by Cheap Trick from The Latest
California Girls, a 2016 mixtape by Lil Peep, re-released in 2021

Other
California Girls (film), a 1985 American film starring Robby Benson
California Girl, a 2004 novel by T. Jefferson Parker